"All In" is a song by American alternative band Lifehouse. It is the second single from their fifth studio album, Smoke & Mirrors.

Video
The video for All In was shot during their concert in Clemson, SC in June 2010 where they were the special guest for Daughtry.

Charts

Weekly charts

Year-end charts

References

2010 singles
Lifehouse (band) songs
Songs written by Jason Wade
2009 songs
Geffen Records singles